Carter Creek is a stream in northeast Crawford County in the U.S. state of Missouri. It is a tributary of the Meramec River.

Carter Creek has the name of a local family.

See also
List of rivers of Missouri

References

Rivers of Crawford County, Missouri
Rivers of Missouri